Daniel J. O'Leary is an American organic chemist. He is the Carnegie Professor of Chemistry at Pomona College in Claremont, California, and runs a lab that uses nuclear magnetic resonance spectroscopy to study compounds.

References

External links
Faculty page at Pomona College

Year of birth missing (living people)
Living people
Pomona College faculty
American chemists
Organic chemists
Linfield University alumni
University of California, Los Angeles alumni